The Government Pension Fund of Norway comprises three entirely separate sovereign wealth funds owned by the government of Norway.

The Government Pension Fund Global, also known as the Oil Fund, was established in 1990 to invest the surplus revenues of the Norwegian petroleum sector. It has over US$1.19 trillion in assets, and holds 1.4% of all of the world’s listed companies, making it among the world’s largest sovereign wealth funds. In December 2021, it was worth about $250,000 per Norwegian citizen. It also holds portfolios of real estate and fixed-income investments. Many companies are excluded by the fund on ethical grounds.

The Government Pension Fund Norway is smaller and was established in 1967 as a type of national insurance fund. It is managed separately from the Oil Fund and is limited to domestic and Scandinavian investments and is therefore a key stock holder in many large Norwegian companies, predominantly via the Oslo Stock Exchange.

Government Pension Fund Global
The Government Pension Fund Global (SPU) is a fund into which the surplus wealth produced by Norwegian petroleum income is deposited. Its name changed in January 2006 from the Petroleum Fund of Norway. The fund is commonly referred to as the Oil Fund.

The purpose of the fund is to invest parts of the large surplus generated by the Norwegian petroleum sector, mainly from taxes of companies but also payment for licenses to explore for oil as well as the State's Direct Financial Interest and dividends from the partly state-owned Equinor. Current revenue from the petroleum sector is estimated to be at its peak period and to decline in the future decades. The Petroleum Fund was established in 1990 after a decision by the country's legislature to counter the effects of the forthcoming decline in income and to smooth out the disruptive effects of highly fluctuating oil prices.

As its name suggests, the Government Pension Fund Global is invested in international financial markets, so the risk is independent from the Norwegian economy. Over 9,123 companies in 73 countries are invested in the fund (2021). On 25 October 2019, the fund's value reached 10,000 billion Kroner, according to its official website.

Background 
Norway has experienced economic surpluses since the development of its hydrocarbon resources in the 70s. This reality, coupled with the desire to mitigate volatility stemming from fluctuating oil prices, motivated the creation of Norway's Oil Fund, now the Government Pension Fund-Global (GPF-G). The instability of oil prices has been of constant concern for oil-dependent countries since the start of the oil boom, but especially so in the decades following the first oil shocks in the 1970s. As the real GDP of oil-exporting states is linked with the price of oil, it has been a goal of these exporters to stabilize oil consumption patterns, and a host of these exporting states singled out sovereign wealth funds as an effective policy tool for achieving this outcome. The adoption of the GPF-G has been in line global economic trends, especially investment patterns. International investment has increased at a significantly higher pace than either global GDP or global trade of goods and services, increasing by 175% over a period at which the former two metrics increased by 53% and 93% respectively.

Management and size

The domestic fund, the Government Pension Fund Norway, is managed by Folketrygdfondet. The global investment fund is managed by Norges Bank Investment Management (NBIM), part of the Norwegian Central Bank on the behalf of the Ministry of Finance. It is the largest pension fund in Europe and larger than the California public-employees pension fund (CalPERS), one of the largest in the United States.

As of June 2011, it was the largest pension fund in the world, but it is not a pension fund in the conventional sense, as it derives its financial backing from oil profits, not pension contributions. In September 2017, the fund exceeded US$1 trillion in value for the first time, a thirteen-fold increase since 2002. With a population of 5.2 million people, the fund was worth $192,307 per Norwegian citizen. Of the assets, 65% were equities (accounting for 1.3% of global equity markets), and the rest were property and fixed-income investments. Norway can withdraw up to 3% of the fund's value each year. The first withdrawal in its history was made in 2016. In a parliamentary white paper in April 2011, the Norwegian Ministry of Finance forecast that the fund would reach $1 trillion by the end of 2019. According to the forecast, a worst-case scenario for the fund value in 2030 was forecast at $455 billion, and a best case scenario at $3.3 trillion. With 2.33 percent of European stocks, it is the largest stock owner in Europe.

In 1998, the fund was allowed to invest up to 40 percent of its portfolio in the international stock market. In June 2009, the ministry decided to raise the stock portion to 60 percent. In May 2014, the Central Bank governor proposed raising the rate to 70 percent. The Norwegian government planned that up to 5 percent of the fund should be invested in real estate, beginning in 2010. A specific policy for the real estate investments was suggested in a report the Swiss Partners Group wrote for the Norwegian Ministry of Finance.

Norway's sovereign wealth fund is taking steps to become more active in company governance.  In the second quarter of 2013, the sovereign fund voted in 6,078 general meetings as well as 239 shareholder proposals on environmental and social issues. Norway's Government Pension Fund Global (GPFG) has the potential to influence the corporate governance market in Europe, and possibly China as well, greatly. It has also started to become active in pushing for lower executive pay.

Relationship to sovereignty
The rise of globalization as the predominant political-economic system has had several key effects on states, especially in regard to interdependence and sovereignty. The erosion of fully independent socioeconomic structures has provoked new questions regarding the role of the state and its ability to project its sovereignty on a set of global economic systems that seem largely out of reach both legally and pragmatically for most states. Sovereign wealth funds are an inherently nationalist type of investment vehicle, and there exists potential for their use as a mitigating force to the supranational forces of globalization. The issue with this is that such practices may lead to a general increase in protectionism as nations attempt to wrestle back control of their economies from external forces, an outcome that most economic intergovernmental organizations, such as the International Monetary Fund, would like to see avoided. Some commentators, like Professor Gordon L. Clark of the University of Oxford, express concerns regarding non-profit considerations motivating the practices of the GPF-G, especially in regards to its ethical concerns and how these considerations may be used as a means of exerting Norwegian standards on foreign firms. On the other hand, the OECD has stated that sovereign wealth funds have had a stabilizing influence on international markets due to their ability to provide capital during times of domestic investor pessimism. The OECD has taken steps to minimize the possibilities of economic protectionism by instituting the Freedom of Investment project, where participating states agree upon guiding sets of principles that seek to boost transparency and transnational investment, while also advising states on how to best handle issues of foreign investment in the sphere of national security.

Debate
As a result of the large size of the fund relative to the low number of people living in Norway (5.2 million people in 2017), the Oil Fund has become a hot political issue, dominated by three main issues:
 Whether the country should use more of the petroleum revenues for the state budget instead of saving the funds for the future. The main matter of debate is to what degree increased government spending would increase inflation.
 Whether the high level of exposure (around 65 percent in 2017) to the highly volatile stock market is financially safe. Others claim that the high diversification and extreme long-term nature of the investments will dilute the risk and that the state is losing considerable amounts of money because of the low investment percentage in the stock market.
 Whether the investment policy of the Petroleum Fund is ethical.

Concerns and potential outcomes 
There are diverse concerns and predicted effects of sovereign wealth funds on international financial markets and the global economy as a whole, with experts expressing strong fears regarding destabilization and protectionism stemming from sovereign wealth funds. The destabilization argument, often cited by Roland Beck of the European Central Bank, is that non-market investment motives may lead sovereign wealth funds managers to make decisions that go against market logic, in turn causing an unexpected and potentially disastrous ripple effect. The protectionist argument, mentioned above in relation to sovereignty and sovereign wealth funds, is essentially a fear that sovereign wealth funds could be used in a non-market, protectionist manner where competing states would perpetuate ever-increasing anti-global free trade movements. However, despite these fears, there is also strong evidence to suggest that sovereign wealth funds are unlikely to gain board of directors seats in their acquisitions. Additionally, Norway’s GPF-G is especially unlikely to gain any board-of-directors seats in a company headquartered in an OECD country. Furthermore, some experts directly contradict fears regarding the destabilizing effect of sovereign wealth funds, arguing that these funds increase the stability of global finance due to the fact that they serve to increase the variety of owners of risky financial vehicles, minimizing exposure to shocks in any one particular industry, while also simultaneously limiting the absolute loss any actor can suffer in a particular global economic sector.

Ethical council
Part of the investment policy debate is related to the discovery of several cases of investment by The Petroleum Fund in very controversial companies, involved in businesses such as arms production, tobacco and fossil fuels. The Petroleum Fund’s Advisory Council on Ethics was established 19 November 2004 by royal decree. Accordingly, the Ministry of Finance issued a new regulation on the management of the Government Petroleum Fund, which also includes ethical guidelines.

According to its ethical guidelines, the Norwegian pension fund cannot invest money in companies that directly or indirectly contribute to killing, torture, deprivation of freedom or other violations of human rights in conflict situations or wars. Contrary to popular belief, the fund is allowed to invest in a number of arms-producing companies, as only some kind of weapons, such as nuclear arms, are banned by the ethical guidelines as investment objects.

To support the ethical screening process, the Council on Ethics works with RepRisk ESG Business Intelligence, a global research firm and provider of environmental, social and governance (ESG) risk data. RepRisk monitors the companies in the Norwegian Pension Fund’s portfolio for issues such as severe human rights violations, particularly regarding child labor, forced labour, and violations of individual rights in conflict areas as well as gross environmental degradation and corruption. RepRisk has been working with the Council on Ethics since 2009 and in 2014, re-won the tender for ESG data provision for 2014-2017.

An investigation by the Norwegian business newspaper  in February 2012 showed that Norway has invested more than $2 billion in 15 technology companies producing technology that can and has been used for filtering, wiretapping, or surveillance of communication in various countries, among them Iran, Syria, and Burma. Although surveillance tech is not the primary activity of all the 15 companies, they have all had or still have some kind of connection to such technology. The Ministry of Finance in Norway stated that it would not withdraw investing in these companies or discuss an eventual exclusion of surveillance industry companies from its investments.

On 19 January 2010 the Ministry of Finance announced that 17 tobacco companies had been excluded from the fund. The total divestment from these companies was $2 billion (NOK 14.2 billion), making it the largest divestment caused by ethical recommendations in the history of the fund.

In March 2014, as the result of both domestic and international pressure, the parliament appointed a panel to investigate whether the fund should divest its coal assets in line with its ethical investment mandate. The panel released its recommendations in December 2014, recommending the fund follow a strategy of corporate engagement rather than divestment. The parliament was set to make its decision early in 2015. In the event, the fund will be required to divest from companies that derive at least 30℅ of their business from coal.

In 2014, the fund divested from 53 coal companies around the world, including 16 companies in the US (among them Peabody Energy, Arch Coal, and Alpha Natural Resources), 13 companies in India (including Coal India) and 3 companies in China. As a result, the total value of the fund’s coal holdings fell by 5% to $9.7 billion. In 2014, the fund also sold its stakes in 59 out of 90 oil and gas companies in which it holds shares by $30 billion.

On 8 March 2019, the Ministry of Finance recommended divestiture from its oil and gas exploration and production holdings. This came after the August 2017 Lofoten Declaration which demanded leadership in a global fossil fuel phase-out from the countries that can most afford to act, such as Norway.

Green energy is becoming an important aspect for the Government Pension Fund since fossil fuel stocks simply are not producing as much value as they used to. As of 2019, new guidelines will prohibit the fund from investing in companies that produce over 20 million tons of coal annually. The fund plans to sell off over $10 billion in stocks from companies using too many fossil fuels. In hopes of improving the Norwegian economy, the firm is becoming more environmentally-friendly by investing in companies that promote renewable energy. For example, the fund will continue to hold stakes in firms like Shell using renewable energy divisions.

In March 2021, it was reported that the Government Pension Fund was examining whether companies in the fund had used forced labor from Xinjiang internment camps.

On 1 December 2021, the fund's head of Governance and Compliance, Carine Smith Ihenacho, told Reuters that companies in its portfolio will be asked to take more specific action on climate change.

Excluded companies
The following companies have been excluded from the Government Pension Fund of Norway for activities in breach of the ethical guidelines:

The fund does not announce exclusions until it has completed sales of its positions, so as not to affect the share price at the time of the transaction.

In 2016, Norges Bank decided to exclude 52 coal companies from the fund.

Reinstated companies
Several previously excluded companies have later been reinstated to the fund because the companies were no longer involved in the activities that had led to their exclusion.

Companies "under observation"
As an alternative to full exclusion from the fund, companies may be placed "under observation" to help put pressure on the company to improve.

It was proposed that one more company, Goldcorp, should be placed under similar observation. Goldcorp, as of 2019, merged with another company and no longer exists.

Currency portfolio
In October 2010 the fund spent NOK 600 million ($136.4 million as of October 2010) daily buying foreign currencies. That figure would be increased to 800 million kroner daily in November. This practice was suspended in January 2011, and on 31 January it was announced that this would also be the case in February.

Government Pension Fund – Norway
The Government Pension Fund – Norway (SPN) was established by the National Insurance Act in 1967 under the name National Insurance Scheme Fund. The name was changed at the same time as the former Petroleum Fund, on 1 January 2006. It continues to be managed by a separate board and separate government entity, still named . The Government Pension Fund – Norway had a value of NOK 240.2 billion at the end of 2017. Unlike the Global division, it is required to limit its investments to companies in the Norwegian stock market, predominantly on the Oslo Stock Exchange.  The Fund is not allowed to own more than a 15% interest in any single Norwegian company.

Notes

See also

 The budgetary rule – concerning the usage of capital gains from The Government Pension Fund – Global
 Pensions in Norway
 Economy of Norway
 Sovereign wealth fund
 Energy Resources of Norway
 Ethical investing

References

External links
Norwegian Ministry of Finance: On the Government Pension Fund
The Government Pension Fund – Norway: Official site
The Government Pension Fund – Global: Official site

1967 establishments in Norway
1990 establishments in Norway
1967 in politics
1990 in politics
1967 in economics
1990 in economics
Sovereign wealth funds
Public pension funds
Public finance of Norway
Retirement in Norway
Government of Norway
North Sea energy